Julius David "Slick" Johnson III (February 23, 1948 – February 14, 1990) was an American stock car racing driver. A veteran of short track competition in the Carolinas, he competed in the NASCAR Winston Cup Series during the 1980s; his best finish in the series, second, came in a non-points consolation race at Daytona International Speedway. He was killed in a racing accident in an ARCA race at Daytona in 1990.

Career

A native of Florence, South Carolina, Johnson started his racing career on dirt tracks at age 16; his racing career was interrupted due to his spending time in the military, however he returned to competition in 1968 at Cooper River Speedway; Johnson also competed at other tracks in the Carolinas during the late 1960s and 1970s including Sumter Speedway.

Moving up from local competition during the 1970s, Johnson made his first start in NASCAR Winston Cup Series competition in 1979 at North Carolina Motor Speedway in Rockingham, North Carolina, finishing 27th in his first race in the series. He would go on to compete in a total of 68 Winston Cup Series races between 1979 and 1987, posting a best finish of eighth on two occasions, both in 1980, at North Wilkesboro Speedway and at Rockingham. Johnson also finished second, to Tim Richmond, in a non-points consolation race for Daytona 500 non-qualifiers at Daytona International Speedway in 1982.

Johnson also competed in a single Budweiser Late Model Sportsman Series race in his career, at Charlotte Motor Speedway in 1983; he started 19th and finished 28th in the event.

Death
In 1988 at Charlotte Motor Speedway, Johnson was injured in a severe crash during a practice session. Following his recovery, Johnson returned to racing in the ARCA Permatex Super Car Series season-opening 200-mile race at Daytona International Speedway in 1990. Starting last in the 40-car field, Johnson was involved in a crash on the race's 76th lap that left him with a basal skull fracture and crushed chest; Johnson had been hit by three other cars during the course of the accident. Transported to Halifax Medical Center in critical condition, Johnson died three days later; he was the 23rd racing-related fatality at Daytona, and the first stock car driver to be killed since Joe Young in 1987.

The accident in which Johnson was involved, in which paramedic Mike Staley was also injured one lap later, was featured in an episode of Rescue 911 that aired on November 13, 1990 on CBS.

Motorsports career results

NASCAR
(key) (Bold – Pole position awarded by qualifying time. Italics – Pole position earned by points standings or practice time. * – Most laps led.)

Winston Cup Series

Daytona 500

Late Model Sportsman Series

ARCA Permatex SuperCar Series
(key) (Bold – Pole position awarded by qualifying time. Italics – Pole position earned by points standings or practice time. * – Most laps led.)

References

External links

1948 births
1990 deaths
Sportspeople from Florence, South Carolina
Racing drivers from South Carolina
NASCAR drivers
ARCA Menards Series drivers
Racing drivers who died while racing
Sports deaths in Florida
Filmed deaths in motorsport